The Kerry-Tipperary rivalry is a Gaelic football rivalry between Irish county teams Kerry and Tipperary, who first played each other in 1894. It is a rivalry that has existed since the very early provincial championships, however, Kerry have dominated throughout. Kerry's home ground is Fitzgerald Stadium and Tipperary's home ground is Semple Stadium.

While Kerry are the standard bearers in Munster and Tipperary are ranked in third position on the roll of honour, they have also enjoyed success in the All-Ireland Senior Football Championship, having won 41 championship titles between them to date.

Statistics

All-time results

Legend

Senior

References

External links
 Kerry-Tipperary all time results

Tipperary
Tipperary county football team rivalries